Procerocymbium is a genus of sheet weavers that was first described by K. Y. Eskov in 1989.

Species
 it contains four species:
Procerocymbium buryaticum Marusik & Koponen, 2001 – Russia
Procerocymbium dondalei Marusik & Koponen, 2001 – Canada
Procerocymbium jeniseicum Marusik & Koponen, 2001 – Russia
Procerocymbium sibiricum Eskov, 1989 (type) – Russia

See also
 List of Linyphiidae species (I–P)

References

Araneomorphae genera
Linyphiidae
Spiders of North America
Spiders of Russia